The enzyme gluconolactonase (EC 3.1.1.17) catalyzes the reaction

D-glucono-1,5-lactone + H2O  D-gluconate

This enzyme belongs to the family of hydrolases, specifically those acting on carboxylic ester bonds.  The systematic name is D-glucono-1,5-lactone lactonohydrolase. Other names in common use include lactonase, aldonolactonase, glucono-δ-lactonase, and gulonolactonase.  This enzyme participates in three metabolic pathways: pentose phosphate pathway, ascorbate and aldarate metabolism, and caprolactam degradation.

References

 
 
 

EC 3.1.1
Enzymes of unknown structure